Ahmose (“Child of the Moon”) was an ancient Egyptian prince and High Priest of Re during the Eighteenth Dynasty of Egypt.

Life
Ahmose was probably a son of Pharaoh Amenhotep II. He was in office as High Priest of Re in Heliopolis during the reign of his brother Thutmose IV. A stela of his, which originally stood probably in Heliopolis, is now in Berlin, his broken statue (probably from Koptos) is in Cairo.

Sources

15th-century BC clergy
14th-century BC clergy
Princes of the Eighteenth Dynasty of Egypt
High Priests of Re
Children of Amenhotep II